The Plundering Time (1644–1646), also known as "Claiborne and Ingle's Rebellion", was a period of civil unrest and lawlessness in the English colony of the Province of Maryland.

Causes of rebellion
The causes of the rebellion included William Claiborne's disputed claim with the Calverts over Kent Island, Maryland, the bitter relations between the Catholic minority elite and the Protestant majority, and the political partisanship of the English Civil War.

The dark period marked a combination of the fall of the British King and religious intolerance, which led directly to the event.

Plundering Time
In 1638, the first provincial Maryland governor Leonard Calvert seized a trading post on Kent Island established by Captain William Claiborne.

In 1644, William Claiborne led an uprising of Protestants and retook Kent Island. Meanwhile, privateer Captain Richard Ingle the co-commander of Claiborne seized control of St. Mary's City the capital of the Maryland colony. Catholic Governor Calvert escaped to the Virginia Colony.

The Protestant pirates began plundering the property of anyone who did not swear allegiance to the English Parliament, mainly Catholics.

End of rebellion
In 1647, the Rebellion was finally put down by Maryland Governor Lord Baltimore, who successfully led Maryland colonial forces against the Parliamentary privateers and regained control of the colony effectively ending the rebellion initiated by Claiborne and Ingle.

Succumbing to illness, Lord Baltimore died the following summer in 1648.

Aftermath
The Maryland colonial assembly issued the Maryland Toleration Act of 1649 to mollify the two factions. A Parliamentary victory in England renewed old tensions leading to the Battle of the Severn, now present-day Annapolis in 1655.

References
Timothy B. Riordan, The Plundering Time: Maryland in the English Civil War, 1642-1650. Maryland Historical Society, 2005.
Paul F. Liston, The plundering Time: The Hardships of Southern Maryland Catholics in Colonial Times. Abbeyfeale Press, 1993.

1644 in Maryland
1645 in Maryland
1646 in Maryland
Province of Maryland
St. Mary's County, Maryland
North America in the English Civil War
Looting